Arrighetti is an Italian surname. Notable people with the surname include:

Ilaria Arrighetti (born 1993), Italian rugby player 
Nicolò Arrighetti (1709–1767), Italian scientist
Valentina Arrighetti (born 1985), Italian volleyball player

See also
Villa Arrighetti, a villa in Tuscany, Italy

Italian-language surnames